Aubrey N. Newman (born December 14, 1927, London) is a British historian who has written widely on the topic of Anglo-Jewish history. Newman served as a professor at the University of Leicester, where he founded the Stanley Burton Centre for Holocaust Studies. He served two terms as President of the Jewish Historical Society of England.

Publications 
 (Editor) Migration and settlement : proceedings of the Anglo-American Jewish Historical Conference held in London jointly by the Jewish Historical Society of England and the American Jewish Historical Society, July 1970 (London: Jewish Historical Society of England, 1971)
 (Editor) Provincial Jewry in Victorian Britain : papers for a conference at University College, London convened by the Jewish Historical Society of England (London: Jewish Historical Society of England, 1975)
 (Editor) The Jewish East End, 1840-1939 (London: Jewish Historical Society of England, 1981)
 The Holocaust. We Must Never Forget, Nor Allow It To Happen Again (London, 2002)
 (co-edited with Barbara Butler) A Sacred Memory. Lectures in Honour of Elchanan and Miriam Elkes (Leicester, 2003)
 (Co-Authored with N. J. Evans, S. Isroff & G Smith) Jewish migration to South Africa: the records of the Poor Jews' Temporary Shelter 1885-1914 (Cape Town: University of Cape Town, 2006)
 (Edited with Bernard Wasserstein and Kenneth Collins)  Two Hundred Years of Scottish Jewry (Glasgow: Scottish Jewish Archives Centre, 2018)

References

20th-century British historians
Academics of the University of Leicester
Living people
1927 births